Draž is a village and municipality in Osijek-Baranja County, Croatia. There are 2,767 inhabitants in the municipality.

Geography
The municipality of Draž is situated between border with Hungary in the north, border with Serbia in the east, municipality of Kneževi Vinogradi in the south, and municipality of Popovac in the south-west.

The municipality of Draž includes the following settlements:
Draž (pop. 505)
Batina (pop. 879)
Duboševica (pop. 554)
Gajić (pop. 294)
Podolje (pop. 140)
Topolje (pop. 395)

Demographics
Ethnic groups in the municipality (2011 census):
1931 Croats (69.79%)
680 Hungarians (24.58%)
90 Serbs (3.25%)

During the Croatian War of Independence (1991–1995), 1300 people were expelled from the municipality. Nearly all have returned since.

Economy
The population is chiefly oriented towards crop and livestock farming. In recent times, there is a trend towards food processing and tourism (hunting and angling). Five kilometers of wine roads have been established.

Two major infrastructure projects  underway are construction of the water supply network and the Batina harbor.

Draž is underdeveloped municipality which is statistically classified as the First Category Area of Special State Concern by the Government of Croatia.

See also 
 Osijek-Baranja County
 Baranja

References

External links 

 Official site
 http://www.tzbaranje.hr/hr/odredista/draz/  
 http://www.zbirka-draz.net/  

Municipalities of Osijek-Baranja County
Baranya (region)